Giovanni Orseolo (981-1006/7) was the first Venetian to hold power in Dalmatia, holding the title of Dux Dalmatiae.

History
Giovanni's father Pietro II Orseolo was the Doge of Venice, and his mother was Maria Candiano.

In 1000 he was sent to Constantinople to work out the details of a plan his father and the Byzantine Emperor Basil II had been working on. Under this agreement the Venetians would conquer Dalmatia and then hold it as a protectorate under Byzantine suzerainty.

While in Constantinople he was given a standard to use in his upcoming invasion of Dalmatia by the Bishop of Olivolo.  He was successful in establishing Venetian power on the Dalmatian coast.

In 1004 Giovanni married Maria Argyre, who was probably niece of Basil II and relative to the latter's second cousin and future emperor Romanos III Argyros. By this time Giovanni had been advanced to the rank of co-doge of Venice.

In 1006 or 1007 Giovanni, along with his wife and son Basilio, died of plague.

References

Sources

981 births
1006 deaths
10th-century Venetian people
11th-century Venetian people
11th-century deaths from plague (disease)
Giovanni